The University of Technology of Compiègne (UTC) is a public research university located in Compiègne, France. The university has both the status of public university and grande école. It was founded in 1972 as the first experimental Institute of Technology in France. The university is a founding member of Sorbonne University Association, a group composed of French leading academic and research institutions, which alumni and faculty include 19 Nobel laureates and 7 Fields Medalists.
A fundamental principle of the UTC is the education of both engineers and citizens inspired by humanist philosophy. Beyond an education in basic sciences (e.g. Mathematics, theoretical physics) and engineering sciences (e.g. thermodynamics, polymer physics), the curriculum also has a strong emphasise on humanities and social sciences (e.g. philosophy, history of science and engineering, journalism). The overarching goal is to form humanist scientists and technologists capable of solving problems within a conscious and ethical framework of environmental, social, and societal consequences.

Academic model 
The university teaching model is a mix between North American and French traditions. The overall curriculum is five years: The first two years are dedicated to basic sciences, while the last three years are focused to engineering sciences. Students typically enter directly after the Baccalauréat, but can also integrate the engineering schools during the third year. Students form their own curriculum by selecting their classes, which are complemented by assisted classwork (French: Travaux dirigés) and applied laboratory work (French: Travaux pratiques).

The university is organised into five Schools of Engineering, namely of (in alphabetical order) Biological Engineering, Computational engineering, Mechanical engineering, Process engineering, and Urban engineering. The university comprises 9 Research Units within the different Schools of Engineering and offers around 30 degree programs in twenty fields, leading to different bachelor's, master's, and doctorate degrees. The university is accredited by the Commission des Titres d'Ingenieur to deliver both the Diplôme d'ingénieur and the academic title of Ingénieur Diplomé.

Ranking 
In 2017, Usine nouvelle ranked UTC No. 2 amongst 107 French engineering schools and universities. In 2016, Usine nouvelle had ranked UTC No. 1 in France for highest number of startup creation by students and recent alumni. The UTC has been ranked No. 1 in France for highest median earnings by recent alumni in 2016 with L'Étudiant.

Research

UTC has established six areas of research as institute priorities: biotechnology, energy and the environment, nanotechnology, computation and information technology, and media and the arts.

UTC is home to a number of research units, including Heudiasyc.

Campus 
The university is one among a small group of French technological universities which tend to be primarily devoted to the instruction of technical arts and sciences.

Faculty 
Notable alumni and faculty includes:
 Julien Bahain, rower, winner of the bronze medal in the 2008 Summer Olympics
 Frédéric Y. Bois, French scientist
 Marie Gayot, sprint athlete, urban planning student
 Vanessa Proux, president of the Institut Sup'Biotech de Paris
 Cécile Réal, French bio-medical engineer and businessperson
 Lamia Chafei Seghaier, Tunisian engineer and politician
 Thierry St-Cyr, former Canadian politician
 Bernard Stiegler, founder and director of the COSTECH research lab

International 
In 2005, UTC created with Shanghai University, UTT and UTBM the Sino-European School of Technology, a multi-disciplinary structure devoted to foundational engineering education, research, and innovation. This school has grown and counts more than 1200 students, including its students in Shanghai and in France.
Its missions are to train high-level specialists in a trilingual and bicultural environment, Chinese and French, by implementing the French engineering education system, and to promote research cooperation between Shanghai University and UTC.

See also
 List of public universities in France by academy
 Université de Technologie
 The University of Technology of Troyes (Université de Technologie de Troyes or UTT)
 The University of Technology of Belfort-Montbéliard (Université de Technologie de Belfort-Montbéliard or UTBM)

Notes and sources

External links
 Université de Technologie de Compiègne 

Grandes écoles
Educational institutions established in 1972
Universities of technology